The Boston Medical Library (1805–1826) in Boston, Massachusetts, was an offshoot of the Boston Society for Medical Improvement. The library "was founded by a group of doctors, a number of officers were then appointed.  John Collins Warren was the Treasurer, John G. Coffin the Secretary.  James Jackson (physician) and John C. Howard were the Trustees.  " In 1826 the library was transferred to the Boston Athenæum.

References

Further reading

External links
 
 "The Boston Medical Library: a Reconstruction of the Collection of 1805 and Its History." Exhibition held at Countway Library of Medicine.
 Boston Medical Library - Countway Library of Medicine

1805 establishments in Massachusetts
1826 disestablishments in Massachusetts
19th century in Boston
Libraries in Boston
Medical libraries
Former library buildings in the United States
Libraries established in 1805
Libraries disestablished in 1826